The Dictionary of Frequently-Used Taiwan Minnan is a dictionary of Taiwanese Hokkien (including Written Hokkien) commissioned by the Ministry of Education of Taiwan. The dictionary uses the Taiwanese Romanization System (based on pe̍h-ōe-jī) to indicate pronunciations and includes audio files for many words. As of 2013, the dictionary included entries for 20,000 words.

In September 2000, initial plans to commission the dictionary were put forth by the National Languages Committee of the Ministry of Education. In July 2001, the Dictionary of Frequently-Used Taiwan Minnan Editorial Committee was established.

In October 2008, a beta version of the dictionary was released. On 7 July 2011, the first approved edition of the dictionary was released.

The dictionary is continuously updated by the Editorial Committee, and these updates are financially supported by the Ministry. On 5 July 2018, the dictionary received a major update. On 1 June 2020, Flash was retired in favor of HTML5 audio for the audio samples.

See also
 Taiwanese Southern Min Recommended Characters

External links

References

Hokkien dictionaries
2008 introductions